Sailing/Yachting is an Olympic sport starting from the Games of the 1st Olympiad (1896 Olympics in Athens, Greece). With the exception of 1904 and the canceled 1916 Summer Olympics, sailing has always been included on the Olympic schedule. The Sailing program of the 1952 Summer Olympics consisted of a total of five sailing classes (disciplines). For each class seven races were scheduled from 20 to 28 July 1952 of the coast of Harmaja.

The sailing was done on the triangular type Olympic courses. The start was made in the center of a set of 8 numbered marks that were places in a circle. During the starting procedure the sequence of the marks was communicated to the sailors. By picking the mark that was most upwind the start could always be made upwind. This system is, at least in certain German lakes, still in use.

Venue 

Two course areas were created in front of Helsinki. One for the Finn just outside the island Liuskasaari. The Finn course was 5.4 nm long and triangular in shape. For the keelboats a course area near the Harmaja lighthouse was used. A 13.1 nm course was set for Star, Dragon, 5.5 & 6 Metre just over one nm South of the lighthouse.
Specially the keelboat course was situated in an area of fair sailing conditions. No currents or tidal movements, and no obstacles around the course that could create wind shadows. On the other hand, the Finn course was set near sheltered islands and thus safe for this type of sailing. This course give the spectators also a nice view of the races.

The races were held from 20 to 23 and 26–28 July. In between the sailors could recover or made boat repairs.

Three yacht clubs were involved:
 Nyländska Jaktklubben 
 Helsingfors Segelsällskap
 Merenkävijät Yachting Club (also for the prize giving ceremony)

Competition

Overview

Continents 
 Africa
 Asia
 Oceania
 Europe
 Americas

Countries

Classes (equipment)

Medal summary

Medal table

Remarks 

 Sailors from abroad were housed in the homes of Finnish yachtsmen
 Two motor launches accommodated pressmen on the yacht race courses
 Only the Yachting officials wore a different official uniform, blue coat and grey trousers
 The Danish shipyard of Borresens Baadebygger was the builder of all Finn dinghies, since then till the beginning of the 21st century closely committed to Olympic Sailing.

Sailors 
During the sailing regattas at the 1952 Summer Olympics among others the following persons were competing in the various classes:
 , Paul Elvstrøm in the Finn won his second consecutive Gold medal
 , Finn sailor Rickard Sarby, also designer of the Finn, injured his right hand during however he took the third place
 , Jock Sturrock in the Dragon. Later skipper of "Gretel" and "Dame Pattie", the first two Australian challenges for the America's Cup.

Notes

References 
 
 
 

 
1952 Summer Olympics events
1952
1952 in sailing
Sailing in Finland